The phase velocity of a wave is the rate at which the wave propagates in any medium. This is the velocity at which the phase of any one frequency component of the wave travels. For such a component, any given phase of the wave (for example, the crest) will appear to travel at the phase velocity. The phase velocity is given in terms of the wavelength  (lambda) and time period  as

Equivalently, in terms of the wave's angular frequency , which specifies angular change per unit of time, and wavenumber (or angular wave number) , which represent the angular change per unit of space,

To gain some basic intuition for this equation, we consider a propagating (cosine) wave . We want to see how fast a particular phase of the wave travels. For example, we can choose , the phase of the first crest. This implies , and so . 

So, it immediately follows that  

As a result we observe a inverse relation between the angular frequency and wavevector. If the wave has higher frequency oscillations, the wave length must be shortened for the phase velocity to remain constant. Additionally, the phase velocity of electromagnetic radiation may – under certain circumstances (for example anomalous dispersion) – exceed the speed of light in vacuum, but this does not indicate any superluminal information or energy transfer. It was theoretically described by physicists such as Arnold Sommerfeld and Léon Brillouin.

Group velocity 

The group velocity of a collection of waves is defined as

When multiple sinusoidal waves are propagating together, the resultant superposition of the waves can result in an "envelope" wave as well as a "carrier" wave that lies inside the envelope. This commonly appears in wireless communications, modulation, a change in amplitude and/or phase is employed to send data. To gain some intuition for this definition, we consider a superposition of (cosine) waves  with their respective angular frequencies and wavevectors. 

We call the velocity of the envelope wave the group velocity.

In the continuous differential case, this becomes the definition of the group velocity.

Refractive index 

In the context of electromagnetics and optics, the frequency is some function  of the wave number, so in general, the phase velocity and the group velocity depend on specific medium and frequency. The ratio between the speed of light c and the phase velocity vp is known as the refractive index, . 

In this way, we can obtain another form for group velocity for electromagnetics. Writing , a quick way to derive this form is to observe

We can then rearrange the above to obtain 

From this formula, we see that the group velocity is equal to the phase velocity only when the refractive index is a constant . When this occurs, the medium is called non-dispersive, as opposed to dispersive, where various properties of the medium depend on the frequency . The relation  is known as the dispersion relation of the medium.

See also 

Cherenkov radiation
Dispersion (optics)
Group velocity
Propagation delay
Shear wave splitting
Wave propagation
Wave propagation speed
Planck constant
Speed of light
Matter wave#Phase velocity

References

Footnotes

Bibliography

Crawford jr.,  Frank S. (1968).  Waves (Berkeley Physics Course, Vol. 3), McGraw-Hill,   Free online version

Wave mechanics